Labracoglossa is a genus of sea chubs native to the western Pacific Ocean.

Species
There are currently two recognized species in this genus:
 Labracoglossa argenteiventris W. K. H. Peters, 1866
 Labracoglossa nitida McCulloch & Waite, 1916 (Blue knifefish)

References

Scorpidinae
Taxa named by Wilhelm Peters
Marine fish genera